Abderrahmane Mssassi (born 24 March 1985) is a Moroccan former professional footballer who played as a defender.

Club career
Mssassi spotted by scouts from Maghreb de Fès during a youth tournament. He played at all youth levels until 2004 when he made his first-team debut. In August 2006, he went on trial with Scottish club Dundee United, but ultimately failed to win a contract.

During the 2007 summer transfer window, he was signed by FAR Rabat. In July 2010, he signed a three-year contract with Wydad Casablanca. Then he returned to his first club Maghreb de Fès in 2012.

Mssassi joined Wydad from FAR Rabat in the summer of 2010. In May 2011, Abderahmane Msassi was given a six match ban and fined US$15,000 by CAF for spitting at the referee during the game.

International career
Mssassi played for Morocco at the 2005 FIFA World Youth Championship in the Netherlands.

References

1985 births
Living people
Moroccan footballers
Morocco under-20 international footballers
AS FAR (football) players
Wydad AC players
People from Fez, Morocco
Association football defenders
Maghreb de Fès players